Diuris recurva, commonly called the mini donkey orchid is a species of orchid that is endemic to the south-west of Western Australia. It has one or two leaves at its base, up to six small pale yellow and brownish flowers and grows in winter-wet places between Badgingarra and Kalbarri.

Description
There is a single raised, ridge-like callus along the mid-line of the labellum. Flowering occurs in July and August.

Taxonomy and naming
Diuris recurva was first formally described in 1991 by David Jones from a specimen collected near Northampton, and the description was published in Australian Orchid Review. The specific epithet (recurva) is a Latin word meaning "recurved", referring to the petals and lateral sepals that are curved backwards.

Distribution and habitat
The mini donkey orchid grows mostly in winter-wet heath between Badgingarra and Kalbarri in the Avon Wheatbelt, Geraldton Sandplains and Jarrah Forest biogeographic regions.

Conservation
Diuris recurva is classified as "Priority Four" by the Government of Western Australia Department of Parks and Wildlife, meaning that is rare or near threatened.

References

recurva
Endemic orchids of Australia
Orchids of Western Australia
Endemic flora of Western Australia
Plants described in 1991